The High Desert League is a high school athletic conference that is affiliated with the CIF Central Section (CIF-CS). Members are schools in the desert and mountain regions of east Kern County and eastern California. The league and its schools joined the CIF-CS in 2013; previously, they were part of the CIF Southern Section.

Members
 Bishop Union High School
 Boron High School
 California City High School
 Desert High School
 Frazier Mountain High School
 Kern Valley High School
 Mammoth High School
 Rosamond High School

References

CIF Central Section
Sports in Inyo County, California
Sports in Kern County, California